Ultimate reality is "a reality that is at the forefront of all transcends all other realities, final, and fundamental power in all reality". This heavily overlaps with the concept of the Absolute in certain philosophies.

Abrahamic religions

In Abrahamic religions, a non-anthropomorphic God is the supreme power behind and beyond all things. God is described as incorporeal, omnipotent, eternal, omniscient, omnipresent, omnibenevolent, and usually described as outside of time (a created reality) as well. God is considered to be the creator of the universe, and the source of morality, which can be known to all by the natural law. Sometimes this God is described in negative terms (cf. apophatic theology), other times in positive terms (cf. cataphatic theology), and which terms any given sect uses depends on their point of view concerning God. God also tends to have many names and titles among each sect, whether in Judaism, in Christianity, or in Islam, among others.

Buddhism

In Theravada Buddhism, Nirvana is ultimate reality. Nirvana is described in negative terms; it is unconstructed and unconditioned. In some strands of Mahayana Buddhism, the Buddha-nature or the Dhammakaya is seen as ultimate reality. Other strands of Buddhism reject the notion of ultimate reality, regarding any existent as empty (sunyata) of inherent existence (svabhava).

Confucianism and Chinese theology
 

In Confucianism and general Chinese theology, Tian connotes the highest principle of creation, monistic in both structure and nature. This conception of Tian evolved over time: in the earliest Confucian canonical texts (such as the Analects of Confucius), Tian was a transcendent universal creator and ruler similar to that of the Hellenistic philosophies and Abrahamic traditions. During the Neo-Confucianism of the Song dynasty, Tian became the will and embodiment of the "natural order" of things, the universal principle guiding the cosmos.

Hellenistic philosophy

There have generally been ideas of an impersonal supreme force or ultimate reality in Hellenistic philosophy, such as among the Stoics, whose physics pantheistically identified the universe with God, rationally creating the cosmos with his pneuma, ordering the cosmos with his logos, and destroying the cosmos in ekpyrosis, only to start the process in rebirth all over again. Among the Platonists of all generations, the highest reality as Form of the Good or The One, an ineffable and transcendent first principle that is both the origin and end of all things.

Hinduism

In Hinduism, Brahman connotes the highest universal principle, the Ultimate reality in the universe. In major schools of Hindu philosophy, it is the material, efficient, formal and final cause of all that exists. It is the pervasive, genderless, infinite, eternal truth and bliss which does not change, yet is the cause of all changes.  Brahman as a metaphysical concept is the single binding unity behind diversity in all that exists in the universe.

Representation 

According to Dadosky, the concept of "ultimate reality" is difficult to express in words, poetry, mythology, and art. Paradox or contradiction is often used as a medium of expression because of the "contradictory aspect of the ultimate reality".

According to Mircea Eliade, ultimate reality can be mediated or revealed through symbols. For Eliade the "archaic" mind is constantly aware of the presence of the Sacred, and for this mind all symbols are religious (relinking to the Origin). Through symbols human beings can get an immediate "intuition" of certain features of the inexhaustible Sacred. The mind makes use of images to grasp the ultimate reality of things because reality manifests itself in contradictory ways and therefore can't be described in concepts. It is therefore the image as such, as a whole bundle of meaning, that is "true" (faithful, trustworthy). Eliade says :
Common symbols of ultimate reality include world trees, the tree of life, microcosm, fire, children, circles, mandalas, and the human body.

See also
 Absolute (philosophy)
 Nondualism

References

Sources

 John Daniel Dadosky. The Structure of Religious Knowing: Encountering the Sacred in Eliade and Lonergan. State University of New York Press, 2004. .

Further reading
 

Conceptions of God